Dara Moazzami (born 10 December 1949) is an Iranian engineering scientist.

Early life

Dara Moazzami was born on December 10, 1949 in Tehran, Iran. Dara Moazzami's parents were natives of Golpayegan, Isfahan province. His father, the late Amir Gholi Moazzami, was a strong advocate of education . He attended the Saint Louis High School, established by the French government in Tehran. After high school, Amir Gholi earned a BA in Law from the University of Tehran and worked as a judge while continuing his education in different fields at Danesh Sara Ali, where he received a BSc in Mathematics, a BA in Persian Literature, and a BA in French Literature. He also pursued his passion for journalism by establishing the Nakhoda newspaper, which he maintained for several years, and was a poet and the author of a textbook entitled "The Lover's Tears."

Dara's uncle, Dr. Abdollah Moazzami, was a renowned professor of law at the University of Tehran who obtained his Ph.D. in law under the guidance of Professor Gilbert Gidel. He also served as a member of the Iranian Parliament for four consecutive terms from 1944 to 1953 and was elected as its Chairman in 1953. Another of Dara's uncles, the late Seyfollah Moazzami, was a renowned electrical engineer and served as the Minister of Post and Telegraph in the second cabinet of Prime Minister Dr. Mohammad Mosaddegh. Growing up in such a highly accomplished family greatly influenced Dara Moazzami and ultimately led him to pursue higher education in mathematics. He earned a B.Sc in Pure Mathematics in 1976 and an M.Sc in Applied Mathematics in 1978 from the University of Quebec-Montreal in Canada.

Career

After completing his studies at the University of Quebec-Montreal, Dara Moazzami returned to Iran and began working at Bu-Ali Sina University in Hamedan. In 1986, while in Hamedan, he translated a book on Differential and Integral Calculus by Piskunov into Persian. He married and later moved to the United States with his family to pursue a doctorate in applied mathematics. In 1992, he received his Ph.D. in applied mathematics, specializing in Graph Theory, from the University of Northeastern-Boston MA, under the supervision of Professors Margaret Cozzens and Samuel Keith Stueckle.  During the 1991-1993 academic years, Dara Moazzami served as an Assistant Professor in the Department of Mathematics and Computer Science at the University of Barry-Miami in Florida. Following his time at the University of Barry-Miami, Dara Moazzami returned to Iran and began his teaching and research career at the College of Engineering at the University of Tehran in 1993. He served as the Head of Engineering Library (2000-2003), Associate Dean of the College of Engineering (2003-2006), Deputy of Undergraduate and Graduate Studies at the Department of Engineering Basic Science (2006-2008), and finally as the Chairman of the Department of Engineering Science (2007-2017). He also founded the Journal of Algorithms and Computation and has continued to serve as its Editor-in-Chief to this day.

From 1993 to 2003, Dara Moazzami was employed as a research scientist at both the Center for Theoretical Physics and Mathematics and the Atomic Energy Organization of Iran. He is a research staff member at Engineering Optimization Research Group (2002–present) and a member of the Board of "Center of Excellence of Geomatic Engineering" (2005–present). During the 2010-2012 academic years, Dara Moazzami served as a Visiting Professor in the Department of Mathematics at the University of California Los Angeles  (UCLA) in the United States.

Dara Moazzami's primary research interests lie in the fields of Graph Theory, Advanced Algorithms, Complexity Theory, and Approximation Algorithm, with a specific focus on Vulnerability in Networks and Tenacity parameters. He is credited with introducing the concept of graph tenacity, which measures network vulnerability and reliability, alongside his professors Cozzens and Stueckle.

Dara Moazzami has translated the widely used and popular textbook on "Graph Theory" by J. A. Bondy and U.S.R. Murty and "Combinatorics" by Bela Bollobas. He is also the author of a textbook on "Differential Equations", which is widely used by Iranian students all over the world. He also translated the textbook "Abstract Algebra: Theory and Application" by Thomas W. Judson, (2017). Dara Moazzami is also the author of three textbooks on topics related to graph theory and network analysis, including "Tenacity Parameter and Their Application in Designing Stable Networks," "Stability and Vulnerability in Networks," and "Graph Drawing." He is also working on two additional books, "Advanced Algorithm: A Guide to the Theory of NP-Completeness" and "Approximation Algorithms." He is also the author of three textbooks on "Tenacity Parameter and Their Application in Designing Stable Networks" and "Stability and Vulnerability in Networks" and "Graph Drawing". Two more books "Advanced Algorithm: A Guide to the Theory of NP-Completeness" and "Approximation Algorithms" are currently in the works. His contributions to the field of mathematics, particularly graph theory and algorithm design, have earned him recognition and respect among the international academic community.

The Tenacity of a Graph

Professor Moazzami's research interests lie in the field of Graph Theory, Advanced  Algorithms, Complexity Theory, and Approximation Algorithm. Particularly, he is interested in vulnerability in networks and tenacity  parameters. The concept of graph tenacity was introduced by Cozzens, Moazzami, and Stueckle in their landmark studies
 as a measure of network vulnerability and reliability.

Conceptually, graph vulnerability relates to the study of graph intactness when parts of its elements are removed. Dara Moazzami's research in the area of vulnerability measures in networks is motivated by the need for a better understanding of how to design and analyze networks in hostile environments. The concept of network tenacity, which he helped introduce, serves as a measure of a network's reliability and resilience in the face of various threats and disruptions. His work in this area seeks to address the challenges posed by network security and reliability in real-world scenarios, and to provide practical solutions for improving the stability and robustness of network systems. Graph tenacity has been an active area of research since the concept was introduced in 1992. Dr. Moazzami introduced two measures of network vulnerability termed the tenacity, T (G), and the Mix-tenacity, Tm (G), of a graph.

Both parameters of T (G) and Tm (G) have been shown to have important implications. Following the pioneering work of Cozzens, Moazzami, and Stueckle, several groups of researchers have started investigating the tenacity and related problems.

Department of Engineering Science

Since its establishment, the College of Engineering at the University of Tehran has been one of the leading engineering schools in Iran, providing quality education and conducting cutting-edge research in various engineering fields. Over the years, the College has expanded its curriculum and now offers programs in various disciplines including mechanical engineering, electrical engineering, materials engineering, chemical engineering, computer engineering, and more. The College has also established research centers and institutes in various fields of engineering to promote interdisciplinary research and collaboration. With a strong commitment to academic excellence and innovation, the College of Engineering at the University of Tehran continues to play a vital role in the development of engineering education and research in Iran.

In 2007, Dara Moazzami played a key role in establishing the first Department of Engineering Science at the University of Tehran. As a result of his efforts and leadership in establishing the first Department of Engineering Science at the University of Tehran, Dr. Dara Moazzami has earned the title of "Father of Engineering Science in Iran." Through his work as the Chairman of the department, he has made significant contributions to the field of engineering science and has helped to establish a strong foundation for future generations of engineers in Iran.

The Engineering Science Program at the University of Tehran is a multi-disciplinary and interdisciplinary undergraduate program that combines aspects of physics, mathematical sciences, and engineering. The program provides students with a comprehensive education in engineering methods and allows them to explore their interests in natural sciences. There are three distinct majors available within the curriculum, including Computational Engineering Science, Engineering Mathematics, and Engineering Physics. These majors prepare students for further studies in engineering and science fields.

Department of Algorithms and Computation

The establishment of the Department of Algorithms and Computation under the leadership of Professor Dara Moazzami in 2005 is a testament to his dedication and commitment to the field of algorithms and computation. This department serves as a hub for students and researchers to explore, study, and advance this important field.

The creation of the department also demonstrates the recognition of the significance of algorithms and computation, and its potential to drive innovation and progress in many different fields and industries. The department provides a platform for interdisciplinary collaboration, as well as opportunities for students to delve into both theoretical and applied aspects of algorithms and computation. The focus on both theoretical and applied research is also noteworthy, as it prepares students for careers in academia and industry, where they may need to apply their knowledge to solve real-world problems. The specific themes targeted by the program, such as computational geometry, graph algorithms, and cryptography, demonstrate the department's commitment to staying current with the latest developments in the field and providing students with a well-rounded education.

Professor Moazzami's leadership and efforts have undoubtedly made a lasting impact on the field, and the Department of Algorithms and Computation will continue to contribute to the advancement of this important area of study for years to come.

The Journal of Algorithms and Computation

Dr. Moazzami is the founder and Editor-in-Chief of The Journal of Algorithms and Computation. The Journal is an English-language publication that continues the legacy of the Journal of the Faculty of Engineering "Fani" at the University of Tehran. From 1980 to 2012, the "Fani" journal published 43 volumes in Persian. In 2012, the Faculty of Engineering decided to launch several journals in English.

The goal of the Journal of Algorithms and Computation is to bring together research in different areas of algorithmic and applied discrete mathematics, as well as applications of combinatorial mathematics to informatics and various fields of science and technology. The journal welcomes research papers, short notes, surveys, and research problems. The "Communications" section is dedicated to the rapid publication of brief research results, with the option to submit a more detailed presentation for publication in the Journal of Algorithms and Computation or elsewhere. The journal also features a limited number of book announcements and conference proceedings, which are thoroughly reviewed and meet the general standards of the journal. The Editor-in-Chief is Dara Moazzami, and the editorial board consists of Kambiz Badie, Eiichi Bannai, Helene Barcelo, Richard A. Brualdi, Hassan Emamirad, Hans-Dietrich Gronau, Gyula O. H. Katona, Daniel Kleitman, Jacobus H. Koolen, Charles C. Lindner, Spyros Magliveras, Mirka Miller, Ali Moeini, Ali Movaghar, Talmage James Reid, Akira Saito, Richard P. Stanley, Walter Denis Wallis, and Qiang (Steven) Wang.

Publications

Moazzami's research area includes vulnerability in Networks and tenacity parameters. He is the author of more than 175 scientific papers.

Honors and awards

- Member of Editorial Board of the Engineering Journal "Fani" University of Tehran.

- Editor - in Chief Journal of Algorithms and Computation.

- Member of Board of Center of Excellence in Geomatic Engineering and Disaster Management.

- Elite Professor of Tehran University.

References

Further reading
 
 
 
 
 
 
 
 
 
 
 
 
 

1949 births
Living people
Iranian engineers